Downpatrick Football Club is an intermediate, association football club based in Downpatrick, County Down, Northern Ireland, playing in the Division 1A of the Northern Amateur Football League. They do not play their home games out of Downpatrick but in Annacloy, a village located 4 miles outside the town.

History
Downpatrick Football Club was founded over 50 years ago to provide a recreational outlet for patients and staff at Downshire Hospital. The hospital, the biggest employer in the town at that time, provided an excellent playing surface and covered accommodation for the large crowds attending the many friendly fixtures arranged, some of which were against senior opposition. When the club decided to play competitively they joined the Church Alliance League shortly after World War II. When the Alliance League ceased Downshire joined the Northern Amateur Football League in 1951, although their stay was brief, leaving in 1953. During the next 20 years Downshire returned to playing friendlies against opposition such as Distillery and Cliftonville from the senior ranks and a host of Amateur League Clubs. Throughout this period the team was backboned by Brian McConvey, Noel Galloway, Noel McKermitt, Michael Bohill, Brian Cheetham, the Healy brothers Pat and Brian, and goalkeeper Harry McCurry (father of Ciaran) who went on to gain full Amateur International Honours.

In the early 1970s the Hospital required the playing area and Grandstand to build an extension, relocating the footballers to their current site within the Hospital complex. Downshire joined the Newcastle and District League in 1975 and by season 1979–80 they were winners of the 1st Division Championship and Harry Clarke Cup double. The Harry Clarke cup was retained in 1980–81 and to complete a very successful three-year period the 1st Division Championship was secured in 1981–82.

Another 1st Division Championship was won in 1989–90 before re-joining the Amateur League in 1991–92. They won Division 2C at the first attempt and the following year won Division 2B. Winning Division 2A was to prove too difficult for the next eight years despite the dedicated effort of managers such as Brian Cheetham, Ciaran McCurry and 'Skipper' McMullan. The appointment of John McCarthy and his assistant Sean Bell gave the club a fresh impetuous and the 2A Championship was won in season 2001–02. They also contested the County Antrim F.A. Junior Shield final that season, losing 2–0 to Raceview Rangers. By this time there had been changes within the hospital body, the Amateur League giving special dispensation for a change of name in 1999, to Downpatricks Hospitals F.C.

In Christmas 2003, Downpatricks Hospitals took part in the Border Cup final against their rivals Killyleagh, losing 2–1. However winning the championship in Division 1A brought a happy ending to the season and Premier League football back to Downpatrick for the first time in twenty years.

In 2006 Downpatrick started a ladies team in their first year; they were just finding their feet, but now they are a team on the up and making very good progress up the leagues and doing well in the cups.

In season 2005 McCarthy and Bell stepped down and Carl Flanaghan and Stephen Galbraith took over and in their first year finished 5th in the table. In season 2007–08 they won the Amateur Premier League title for the first time in 29 years and got to the last 16 in the Irish Cup. In season 2008/2009 they almost made it two titles in a row, only to lose out by a point.

Both managers stepped down at end for 2009 season to be replaced by David and Paul Stranney, who in their first couple of months reached the Steel & Sons Cup final on Christmas Day 2009, where they were defeated by their neighbours Kilmore 2–0 at Seaview, home of Irish Premier League side Crusaders.

Honours

Intermediate honours
Northern Amateur Football League: 1
2007–08

External links
 Downpatrick Official Club website
 nifootball.co.uk - (For fixtures, results and tables of all Northern Ireland amateur football leagues)

 

Association football clubs in Northern Ireland
Downpatrick
Association football clubs in County Down
Northern Amateur Football League clubs
2001 establishments in Northern Ireland
Association football clubs established in 2001